Edwin Mahinda, is a retired Kenyan actor. Starting his cinema career as a child artist, Mahinda is best known for the roles in the films The Kitchen Toto, White Mischief and The Lion of Africa.

Career
In 1987, Mahinda made his maiden cinema appearance with the British drama film The Kitchen Toto. He played the lead role 'Mwangi' in the film, where he later won the Paris Film Festival Award for Best Actor. With the success of the film, he was then selected for the 1987 film White Mischief for the minor role of 'Boy Waiter at Wake'. However, in 1988, he again played the supportive role 'Joko's Brother' in the American adventure film The Lion of Africa. The film had its premiere on June 28, 1987, on HBO.

In 1989, Mahinda made his final film appearance. He played the role of 'Moja' in the Piramiddo no kanata ni: White Lion densetsu.

Filmography

References

External links
 

Living people
20th-century Kenyan male actors
Kenyan male film actors
Year of birth missing (living people)